Mahdi Khan or Mehdi Khan or Mehdikhan may refer to:

Mehdikhan, Kurdistan
Mahdi Khan, Lorestan